Robin Wood is a recurring character on the television series Buffy the Vampire Slayer. The character, present for most of Season Seven, is played by D. B. Woodside.

Biography
In Season Seven of Buffy the Vampire Slayer, Robin is the first (and only) principal of the newly rebuilt Sunnydale High School when Buffy's sister Dawn Summers begins her sophomore year. At first, Buffy wonders if he may be evil, but nevertheless accepts a job offer from him. For much of the season, hints are dropped that Robin is aware of the mystical situation in Sunnydale — he finds and buries Jonathan Levinson's body, for example — but the viewer is left without any indication as to which side he fights for.

The character is portrayed as having a good sense of humor and communicating well with students. He is a vegetarian and claims to have once been suspended for threatening to attack another student who bullied him during high school. Robin's easygoing attitude and confidence are presented in sharp contrast to the previous high school principal characters depicted as nervous (Principal Flutie) and excessively disciplinarian (Principal Snyder), making him a well-liked educator among the students, alumns, and faculty members.

However, in the episode "Him", a troubled student, RJ Brooks, develops a resentment towards Robin, leading to an attempt on Robin's life by Buffy (who was under RJ's family's love spell at the time); she attempts to kill Robin with her rocket launcher, though he is saved by Xander, Willow and Spike.

In the episode "First Date", it is revealed that Robin's mother, Nikki Wood (who was first seen in the episode "Fool for Love"), had been a Slayer in New York City, and that he is a "freelance" demon fighter. On a date with Buffy, Robin explains that his mother was killed by a vampire; he later learns, from the First Evil, that this vampire is Spike. He was raised and trained by Nikki's Watcher, not in New York but in Beverly Hills (according to the episode "Help").

As retribution for his mother's murder, Robin conspires with Giles to distract Buffy and kill Spike. However, the plan fails and Buffy realizes what has gone on, temporarily alienating Robin from the group. After Faith's return, Robin returns to the fold and becomes interested in Faith; the two become physically intimate in the episode "Touched". Prior to the final battle in the episode "Chosen", Robin expresses concern that Faith views men as mere sex objects, and pledges to surprise her if they survive.

Post-Sunnydale
Robin appears in "No Future for You", the second arc of the canonical comic book series Buffy the Vampire Slayer Season Eight. Like Andrew, Robin is in charge of a squad of slayers, and is shown to be working at the Hellmouth in Cleveland. In his one-panel appearance he calls Faith to tell her of a family that was recently attacked by vamps. Faith refers to him as "the ex" implying the couple has ended their relationship since "Chosen".

Powers
Robin did not inherit any powers from his mother. He was, however, trained in the martial arts and various vampire killing tactics by his mother's former Watcher.

Appearances

Canonical appearances
Robin appeared in 14 canon Buffyverse episodes
Buffy the Vampire Slayer
Season 7: "Lessons", "Beneath You", "Help", "Him", "Never Leave Me", "Bring on the Night", "First Date", "Get It Done", "Storyteller", "Lies My Parents Told Me", "Dirty Girls", "Empty Places", "Touched", "Chosen"

Buffy the Vampire Slayer Season Eight
"No Future for You, Part 1"

References

Buffy the Vampire Slayer characters
Fictional principals and headteachers
Fictional vampire hunters
Martial artist characters in television
Fictional African-American people
Fictional characters from Beverly Hills, California
Fictional characters from New York City
Television characters introduced in 2002
Male characters in television
Fictional vegan and vegetarian characters
American male characters in television